The {{nihongo|No.8 minesweeper|第八号掃海艇|Dai Hachi Gō Sōkaitei}}, also sometimes called W-8 was a  minesweeper owned and operated by the Imperial Japanese Navy during World War II, and one of only two W-7 class minesweeper to survive World War II. The ship was laid down on 11 December 1937, and completed on 15 February 1939. Upon completion, it was registered with the Sasebo Naval District. After making it through World War II with fairly little damage, the ship was scuttled by the Royal Navy in the Strait of Malacca on 13 July 1946.

Service 
On 1 June 1941, W-8 was assigned to MineSweepDiv 21 with W-7, W-9, W-11 and W-12. W-10 was not included because it was sunk after an attack on Vigan. On 12 December 1941, W-8 participated in the capture of Legaspi, in the Philippines. On 17 December, W-8, along with W-7, provided cover during the invasion of Miri, Borneo. Between 19 December and 9 January 1942, W-8 helped escort a convoy to Lamon Bay, and traveled to several ports in the Philippines. On 9 January, W-8 participated in Operation "H", which was the invasion Celebes, Dutch East Indies. W-8, along with the other remaining W-7 Class ships, helped escort other ships of the Celebes Seizure Convoy. On 23–24 January, many of the same ships escorted some ships to the invasion of Kendari. On 31 January, many of the same ships also participated escorting the Ambon Islands invasion convoy. On 5  February, W-8 assisted in escorting the Makassar invasion convoy. On 20 February, W-8 was attacked by USS Pike, after it misidentified W-7 and W-8 as light cruisers. Both shots USS Pike fired missed. Both minesweepers managed to get away from the submarine before it could get off any more shots.

After the attack, W-8 participated in a number of uneventful convoys and minesweeping activities, mainly around Truk, until 16 January 1943. On 16 January, the Japanese tanker Toei Maru was struck by a submarine, and began to sink. It is unclear whether W-8 was still escorting Toei Maru or not at the point of the attack, although it is assumed that the escort was heading back to Truk. Three days later, on 19 January, W-8 returned to the sight of the attack and picked up any survivors. After another three months, W-8 headed towards the Marshall Islands, but returned to Truk on 27 April. On 6 August, W-8 was dry-docked for repairs. It was undocked on 23 September.

Between 23 September 1943 and 1 July 1945, W-8 took part in several escorts an minesweeping operations. On 1 July, while escorting Sub Chaser no. 2, from Surabaya to Makassar, W-8 and Sub Chaser no. 2 were "attacked by 2 enemy submarines at 0228 and 0250 and sunk in 7-30S 116-15E", according to FRUMEL intercepts.

Post war
On 2 September 1945, the Japanese Instrument of Surrender was signed aboard USS Missouri by representatives from Japan, the United States, the Republic of China, the United Kingdom, the Soviet Union, Australia, Canada, the Provisional Government of the French Republic, the Kingdom of the Netherlands, and the Dominion of New Zealand. Despite this, W-8 did not receive notice of the end of the war until 15 September, thirteen days later, while docked at Surabaya.

On 10 July 1946, W-8 arrived at Keppel Harbour, in Singapore. On 13 July 1946, it was scuttled by the Royal Navy in the Malacca Straits. It was officially removed from the Japanese Navy's list of ships on 10 August.

References 

Mine warfare vessels of the Imperial Japanese Navy
1938 ships
Ships built by Uraga Dock Company